Scheer is a town in the district of Sigmaringen, in Baden-Württemberg, Germany. It is situated on the Danube, 6 km east of Sigmaringen.

References

Sigmaringen (district)
Württemberg
Populated places on the Danube